The Fifth Military Region is a military region of Armed Forces of Yemen. Its headquarters locates in Hudaydah Governorate.

History 
The fifth region was established in 2013. As part of the military restructuring, former president Abdrabbuh Mansur Hadi issued a republication decree to divide the military field into seven regions, including the Fifth Military Region. The region is headquartered in Hudaydah city and supervises the military units in Hudaydah and Hajjah Governorates.

Structure 
The region basically consists of 11 military units and brigades, including; 121 Infantry Brigade, 82 Infantry Brigade, 105 Infantry Brigade, 25 Mechanised Infantry Brigade, 2nd Border Guard Brigade.

Leadership 

 Major General Mohammed Rajeh Labwzah (2013–2015)
 Major General Tawfiq al-Qiz (2016– 2017)
 Major General Omar Sajaf ( 24 February 2017– 17 February 2018)
 Major General Yahya Salah (17 February 2018– incumbent)

See also 

 First Military Region

References 

Military regions of Yemen
Military of Yemen
Ministry of Defense (Yemen)
2013 establishments in Yemen